Saturday's Lesson is a 1929 Our Gang short silent comedy film directed by Robert F. McGowan.  Produced by Hal Roach and released to theaters by Metro-Goldwyn-Mayer, it was the 93rd Our Gang short to be released, and the final silent film in the series. As with two previous silent Our Gang shorts, Little Mother and Cat, Dog & Co., Saturday's Lesson was withheld until after several sound Our Gang films had been released.

Cast

The Gang
 Joe Cobb as Joe
 Jean Darling as Jean
 Allen Hoskins as Farina
 Bobby Hutchins as Wheezer
 Mary Ann Jackson as Mary Ann
 Harry Spear as Harry
 Pete the Pup as himself

Additional cast
 Orpha Alba as Joe's mom
 Jack O'Brien as The Devil
 Emma Reed as Farina's mom
 Adele Watson as The Other Kids' mom
 Charley Young as Dr. A.M. Austin
 Allan Cavan - Pedestrian #2
 Ham Kinsey - Pedestrian #1

See also
 Our Gang filmography

References

External links

1929 films
American silent short films
American black-and-white films
1929 comedy films
1929 short films
Films directed by Robert F. McGowan
Metro-Goldwyn-Mayer short films
Our Gang films
1920s American films
Silent American comedy films
1920s English-language films